Ahsha Safaí (born 1973) is an American elected official in San Francisco, California. He serves as a member of the San Francisco Board of Supervisors representing Supervisorial District 11.

District 11 includes the neighborhoods of Excelsior, Ingleside, Oceanview, Merced Heights, Ingleside Heights, Mission Terrace, Outer Mission, Cayuga, and Crocker Amazon.

Early life, education and career 
Safaí was born in Iran in 1973, and moved with his mother to Cambridge, Massachusetts at the age of five. He attended Northeastern University, where he graduated with a bachelor's degree in political science and African-American studies. He later went on to receive his master's degree in city planning from Massachusetts Institute of Technology (MIT).

In San Francisco, Safaí served as political director for the janitors union local.

San Francisco Board of Supervisors 
In 2008, he ran for the District 11 seat on the San Francisco Board of Supervisors against John Avalos, losing by a close margin. Safaí ran again in 2016, successfully, replacing Avalos who was termed out of office. During the 2016 race, he ran against Kimberly Alvarenga; Safaí was endorsed by the San Francisco Chronicle.

He worked with Dean Preston and Aaron Peskin to delay the construction of thousands of units in the Hub so that TODCO, a prominent anti-housing group in San Francisco, could perform a race and equity study on the project within six months. More than two years later, TODCO had not begun the study and the group said it had no intent to do so.

In 2021, Safaí said he would oppose the building of modular housing for the homeless in San Francisco unless it used labor from San Francisco; a Vallejo company had up until then provided modular housing complexes faster and cheaper than other companies could.

In 2021, Safaí supported a proposal by Mayor London Breed to streamline housing production in San Francisco.

In April 2022, Safaí voted against keeping cars off the east end of John F. Kennedy Drive in Golden Gate Park. The ordinance passed 7-4.

Personal life 
Safaí, his wife Yadira, and their children live in San Francisco's Excelsior District.

References

External links 

 

Living people
1973 births
21st-century American politicians
Iranian emigrants to the United States
American politicians of Iranian descent
California Democrats
San Francisco Board of Supervisors members
Northeastern University alumni
MIT School of Architecture and Planning alumni
People from Cambridge, Massachusetts
Asian-American city council members